Heathcote Valley is a suburb of Christchurch, New Zealand. It is named after Sir William Heathcote, who was secretary of the Canterbury Association.

Location
The road is part of the State Highway 74 network. The Main South Railway line also passes through the suburb, before entering the Lyttelton rail tunnel that connects with the port of Lyttelton.

Heathcote Valley is the lower terminus of the Christchurch Gondola, which goes up to Mount Cavendish on the Port Hills, and also for the Bridle Path walking track over the northern rim of the Lyttelton volcano to the port of Lyttelton.

History

In the past the Heathcote Valley was known for its orchards, brickworks and maltworks. The distinctive towers of the Canterbury Malting Company's maltworks dominated the skyline until 2012 - when along with the rest of the remaining buildings were demolished to make way for residential developments.

Relation to Heathcote River

Despite its name, Heathcote Valley is situated some two kilometres south of the Heathcote River, which does not flow through the suburb but rather flows east across a wide plain.

Demographics

Heathcote Valley had a population of 2,229 at the 2018 New Zealand census, an increase of 111 people (5.2%) since the 2013 census, and an increase of 57 people (2.6%) since the 2006 census. There were 873 households. There were 1,083 males and 1,146 females, giving a sex ratio of 0.95 males per female. The median age was 44.6 years (compared with 37.4 years nationally), with 411 people (18.4%) aged under 15 years, 330 (14.8%) aged 15 to 29, 1,080 (48.5%) aged 30 to 64, and 405 (18.2%) aged 65 or older.

Ethnicities were 94.1% European/Pākehā, 6.9% Māori, 1.7% Pacific peoples, 2.3% Asian, and 2.0% other ethnicities (totals add to more than 100% since people could identify with multiple ethnicities).

The proportion of people born overseas was 20.6%, compared with 27.1% nationally.

Although some people objected to giving their religion, 59.1% had no religion, 30.1% were Christian, 0.3% were Hindu, 0.5% were Muslim, 0.1% were Buddhist and 2.0% had other religions.

Of those at least 15 years old, 459 (25.2%) people had a bachelor or higher degree, and 294 (16.2%) people had no formal qualifications. The median income was $36,100, compared with $31,800 nationally. The employment status of those at least 15 was that 927 (51.0%) people were employed full-time, 315 (17.3%) were part-time, and 36 (2.0%) were unemployed.

Education
Heathcote Valley School is a full primary school catering for years 1 to 8. It had a roll of  The school started in a private house in 1860 and the first classroom opened in 1861.

Notable residents
Wally Argus – New Zealand rugby international who bought a market garden in Heathcote Valley in 1949
Bob Parker – former mayor of Christchurch was brought up here

Further reading
 In The Shadow Of The Rock, 150 Years of Heathcote Valley, 2010, Paul Corliss

References

External links
Christchurch City Libraries: Gimblett Collection historic photographs of Heathcote Valley
Official site of the Christchurch Gondola

Suburbs of Christchurch